In America may refer to:
 In America (novel), a novel by Susan Sontag
 In America (film), a 2002 Irish film by Jim Sheridan
 In America (Kenny G album)
 "In America" (song), a song by the Charlie Daniels Band
 "In America", a song by Creed from My Own Prison
"In America", a 1989 song by Fastbacks
 "In America", a series of CNN documentaries hosted by Soledad O'Brien